Buteh Gaz (also Romanized as Būteh Gaz; also known as Botteh Gaz, Būta Gaz, and Būteh Kār) is a village in Pain Velayat Rural District, Razaviyeh District, Mashhad County, Razavi Khorasan Province, Iran. At the 2006 census, its population was 78, in 22 families.

References 

Populated places in Mashhad County